Tropical Storm Dean was a strong tropical storm that affected at least twelve islands along its path from the tropical Atlantic Ocean to east of Atlantic Canada in August 2001. Dean developed from a tropical wave on August 22 over the Lesser Antilles, and was initially predicted to intensify further to reach hurricane status. However, strong wind shear quickly weakened Dean to cause it to dissipate on August 23. The remnants turned northward, and redeveloped on August 26 to the north of Bermuda. The storm subsequently weakened over cooler waters, and became extratropical on August 28.

The precursor tropical wave dropped heavy rainfall and produced moderate winds throughout the Lesser Antilles, though no serious damage was reported. In Puerto Rico, rainfall of up to  produced widespread flooding across the island. Thousands were left without power or water, and two houses lost their roofs from the storm. The passage of Dean resulted in $7.7 million (2001 USD, $9.4 million 2008  USD) in damage in Puerto Rico. The storm produced light to moderate rainfall in Bermuda and later in Newfoundland, though no damage was reported.

Meteorological history

A large tropical wave with minimal convection moved off the coast of Africa near Dakar between August 14 and August 15. It moved westward, and gradually developed thunderstorms across the wave axis. It continued to become better organized, and though a Reconnaissance flight into the system reported strong winds, it lacked a surface circulation. Late on August 21 the wave passed through the northern Lesser Antilles, and subsequent to a decrease in wind shear the system became much better organized on August 22. A surface circulation formed, and the system developed into Tropical Storm Dean on August 22 near Saint Croix. Dean was upgraded directly to a tropical storm due to the presence of  winds in the storm.

Reconnaissance Aircraft and surface reports confirmed the existence of a circulation. The storm strengthened slightly to reach winds of  later on August 22, though the circulation was exposed on the western edge of the convection due to the storm's quick forward motion and persistent wind shear. However, an upper-level trough produced an increase of shear over the storm, and by August 23 Dean weakened to a tropical depression. Hours later, the circulation dissipated, and Dean degenerated into a tropical wave to the east of the Bahamas. Regeneration was considered unlikely at the time.

The remnants of Dean turned to the north, and became embedded within a large mid-level trough off the East Coast of the United States. Convection increased around the system early on August 24. However, a reconnaissance flight into the remnants of Dean reported a broad low pressure area with the strongest winds and convection located far from the area of minimum pressure, indicating it had some non-tropical characteristics. The weak disturbance passed to the west of Bermuda early on August 25, and subsequently began to drift to the northeast. Operationally, the National Hurricane Center did not re-initiate advisories until fifteen hours later.

The convection became better organized, and Dean steadily strengthened as it tracked northeastward. A ship near the center of Dean confirmed the storm re-developed. The convection near the center greatly organized, and an eye feature began to develop. The eye feature failed to develop further, and after maintaining its peak intensity for 12 hours Dean weakened over progressively cooler waters. The extratropical storm continued northeastward until being absorbed by a frontal low on August 29.

Impact and preparations

Caribbean

About a day before Dean developed, the National Hurricane Center advised interests in the northern and central Lesser Antilles to monitor the progress of the storm. Routine statements issued by the National Hurricane Center warned for the possibility of strong winds and heavy rains. However, because Dean formed after it passed the islands, no tropical cyclone warnings or watches were issued.

There, minor flooding was reported. Moderate wind gusts downed small trees and branches in Saint Croix and Saint John, and some roads were damaged in Saint John, as well. Heavy rains and gusty winds caused power outages throughout the U.S. Virgin Islands. The passage of Tropical Storm Dean resulted in minor damage totaling to $20,000 (2001 USD, $24,400 2008 USD).

Winds were generally light across the island. The passage of Dean resulted in widespread flooding in eastern and southern Puerto Rico, collapsing two bridges and one road. Several highways were under water, and one car was swept away by the floodwaters. The four inside the vehicle were later rescued and unharmed. Throughout the island, about 1,320 houses were flooded, and two houses experienced collapsed roofs. The rains left various towns without power or water. By the night after the storm passed the island, more than 16,000 were without power, while almost 70,000 lacked potable water. Over 130 people were evacuated from low-lying areas to hurricane shelters.
Two people were injured in Peñuelas, and three were injured in Nagüabo when the ceiling of a day care center collapsed, though no deaths occurred on the island. One airline canceled seventeen flights in and out of the island, and one cruise line was required to alter its path to both Dean and earlier due to Tropical Storm Chantal. Damage in Puerto Rico totaled to $7.7 million (2001 USD, $9.4 million 2008 USD), of which $2.1 million (2001 USD, $2.6 million 2008 USD) was from agricultural damage.

Bahamas, Bermuda, and Canada
Shortly after Dean formed, the government of the Bahamas issued a tropical storm warning for the southeastern Bahamas and the Turks and Caicos Islands. When the storm weakened and ultimately dissipated, the warnings were canceled. The passage of Dean resulted in the coldest day of August 2001 on the island.

See also

 List of Bermuda hurricanes
 Other storms of the same name
 Timeline of the 2001 Atlantic hurricane season

References

External links

NHC Tropical Cyclone Report for Tropical Storm Dean
NHC advisory archives for Tropical Storm Dean

2001 Atlantic hurricane season
Atlantic tropical storms
Hurricanes in Puerto Rico
Hurricanes in Bermuda
Hurricanes in Canada
Dean